Dagny is a Scandinavian feminine given name of Norwegian origin. Alternate forms include Dagna, Dagne and the Latvian form Dagnija.

It is derived from the combination of the Old Norse words  'day' and  'new'. While appearing in Norse mythology, it had virtually fallen out of use for centuries, and was revived at the second half of the 19th century. This is attributed either to a character of that name in Henrik Ibsen’s 1857 play "The Vikings of Helgeland" or more likely to the popularity of Dagny, a Scandinavian women's magazine founded in 1886. In any case, it was at its most common in Scandinavia in the early to mid 20th century.

Notable people with the name include: 
Dagný Brynjarsdóttir, Icelandic soccer player
Dagny Carlsson, Swedish blogger
Dagny Hald, Norwegian ceramist and illustrator
Dagny Haraldsen, mother of Queen Sonja of Norway
Dagny Hultgreen, American TV personality of Norwegian heritage
Dagny Jørgensen, Norwegian alpine skier
Dagny Johnson, American environmentalist activist in Florida
Dagny Juel, Norwegian writer
Dagny Knutson, American swimmer of Norwegian heritage
Dagny Lind, Swedish film actress
Dagny Mellgren, Norwegian footballer
Dagny Norvoll Sandvik, Norwegian vocalist
Dagny Rollins, an actor in The Worst Witch
Dagny Servaes (1894–1961), German-Austrian actress
Dagný Skúladóttir, Icelandic handball player
Dagny Taggart, fictional character in Atlas Shrugged
Dagny Tande Lid, Norwegian painter, illustrator and poet
Dagny, Ørnulv's daughter, fictional character in The Vikings of Helgeland
Dagnija Staķe, Latvian politician
 Dagnija Lejina, Latvian startup and innovation ecosystem activist

Norwegian feminine given names